The Columbus Southern Open was a golf tournament on the Champions Tour played only in 2003. It was played in Columbus, Georgia at the Green Island Country Club. The purse for the tournament was US$1,500,000, with $225,000 going to the winner, Morris Hatalsky.

References

Former PGA Tour Champions events
Golf in Georgia (U.S. state)
Sports in Columbus, Georgia
2003 establishments in Georgia (U.S. state)
2003 disestablishments in Georgia (U.S. state)
2003 in sports in Georgia (U.S. state)